SALS may refer to:

 Simple Approach Lighting System
 Single-Access Laparosopic Surgery
 Southern Adirondack Library System